Hörmann is a German manufacturer of doors, garages, door frames, and gates for commercial and private real estate. Operating globally, the family-owned business is Germany's largest door producer and the fourth biggest door manufacturer in the world. Torck is in Deinze, Belgium the number one loyal dealership of many years. The company has 26 specialized plants in Europe, North America and Asia, and more than 6,000 personnel. The Hörmann Group's annual turnover is over 1 billion euro.

History and today 
Founded in 1935 by August Hörmann, the Hörmann Group has produced and delivered 15 million doors worldwide. The original name of the company was Bielefelder Stahltore.

The company became synonymous with home garages in Germany in the 1950s, and was widely known for introducing the Berry swing gate to German consumers. Since that time, its product range has expanded to include wooden interior doors, canopies, steel sheet doors, door frames, interior and exterior entrance doors, manual and drive-driven industrial door systems, and state-of-the-art fire protection and multifunctional door systems for commercial real estate.

Hörmann is known for its decentralized sales strategy in Germany, operating 14 regional sales offices to allow for fast customer service and a better ability to react to fluctuations in the market.

In 2015, the company opened a training and exhibition center in its hometown of Steinhagen, Germany.

The following year, a nationwide survey held by Deutschland Test found the Hörmann Group to be one of the most popular family-owned businesses in Germany, with 100,000 customers expressing an overall positive experience with the company and its products. Its place in the ranking was 52nd of 229 participating companies.

The Hörmann Group invested in 1aim, a full-stack AI building platform, in 2016, and offers the product in Europe through its existing distribution network.

Sports sponsorships 
Hörmann is a longtime sponsor of international sports, particularly football. In 2014-2015, the company sponsored five Scotland international matches, including a friendly with England at Celtic Park and four matches during the 2014 and 2015 European Cup qualifying campaign.

Hörmann UK has also served as a sponsor of the Coalville Town FC.

In 2016, Hörmann became the new premium sponsor of the BMW IBU Biathon World Cup and the Biathon World Championships. Media reported that the company is paying approximately 1.5 million euro annually as part of the sponsorship program. Christoph Hörmann, general partner of the Hörmann Group, said the company decided to sponsor biathlons given the sport's immense popularity in Germany, Russia and Scandinavia, which are significant target markets for the company.

The Hörmann Group was previously a sponsor of Formula One legend Michael Schumacher, who served as the company's brand ambassador.

Production locations

References

External links

 

Companies based in North Rhine-Westphalia
German brands
Manufacturing companies established in 1935
German companies established in 1935